Domrownyssus is a genus of mites in the family Laelapidae.

Species
 Domrownyssus dentatus (Domrow, 1961)

References

Laelapidae